Just Us is an album recorded by American drummer Roy Haynes's Trio in 1960 for the New Jazz label.

Reception

Allmusic awarded the album 3 stars stating "Haynes' concise drum solos always hold one's interest, and even though this tasteful date is far from definitive, the music is enjoyable".

Track listing
 "Down Home" (Curtis Fuller) - 7:26
 "Sweet and Lovely"  (Gus Arnheim, Harry Tobias, Jules LeMare) - 6:56
 "As Long as There's Music" (Sammy Cahn, Jule Styne) - 3:43
 "Well Now" (Haynes) - 1:56
 "Cymbalism" (Roy Haynes, Richard Wyands) - 7:00
 "Con Alma" (Dizzy Gillespie) - 6:31
 "Speak Low" (Ogden Nash, Kurt Weill) - 7:03

Personnel 
Roy Haynes - drums
Richard Wyands - piano
Eddie De Haas - bass

References 

1960 albums
Roy Haynes albums
New Jazz Records albums
Albums produced by Esmond Edwards
Albums recorded at Van Gelder Studio